Shashi Shrestha (Nepali: शशी श्रेष्ठ) is a Nepalese politician, Central Committee member of Janamorcha Nepal (Amik Sherchan faction). She was appointed as Minister of State for Health and Population on April 29, 2007.

Shrestha is the head of the Janamorcha-supported All Nepal Women's Association.

References

Government ministers of Nepal
Living people
Communist Party of Nepal (Unity Centre–Masal) politicians
Women government ministers of Nepal
Nepal MPs 2017–2022
Nepal Communist Party (NCP) politicians
Communist Party of Nepal (Maoist Centre) politicians
1962 births